Parineeta Borthakur is an Indian film and television actress and singer from Assam. She is known for playing Sharmishta Bose in Swaragini, Anjana Hooda in Bepannah and Ganga Shiv Gupta in Gupta Brothers. Her younger sister Plabita Borthakur is also a singer and actress.

Career 
Borthakur made her film debut with the Assamese film Nayak. Her first appearance on TV was in Pritam Pyare Aur Woh on SAB TV as Gogi. She also featured in Bollywood movies like Force, Chalo Dilli and Kurbaan. In 2015, she played the role of Sharmishta Bose in Colors TV's Swaragini. In 2017, she was seen in Zee TV's Ek Tha Raja Ek Thi Rani as Vasundhra Suryavanshi. In same year she starred in Assamese movie Gaane Ki Aane alongside Zubeen Garg.In 2018, she portrayed Anjana Hooda in Colors TV's Bepannaah.

In January 2020, she launched India's first vegan and paraben free highly pigmented lip plumpers, under the cosmetic brand- Nyor.

She was last seen as the Main Female Lead, Ganga Shiv Gupta, in Star Bharat's Gupta Brothers  opposite Hiten Tejwani.

Filmography

Films

Television

Awards and nominations

References

External links
 

1985 births
Living people
Assamese playback singers
Assamese-language singers
Bollywood playback singers
21st-century Indian women singers
21st-century Indian singers
Indian singer-songwriters
Indian pop singers
Indian women playback singers
Indian women pop singers
Indian women singer-songwriters
Actresses from Assam
Indian film actresses
Singers from Assam
People from Dibrugarh district